The 2015–16 Chicago Bulls season was the 50th season of the franchise in the National Basketball Association (NBA). Fred Hoiberg was selected as the head coach, after the firing of previous head coach Tom Thibodeau.

Jimmy Butler, for the second time was voted to play in the 2016 NBA All-Star Game, which was held in Toronto. However, Butler was unable to play due to injury and replacing him was teammate Pau Gasol.

Derrick Rose played in 66 games this season, the most since his MVP campaign in 2010-11. Following the season, he was traded to the New York Knicks, Joakim Noah signed as a free agent with the Knicks and Gasol signed with the San Antonio Spurs.

The Bulls missed the playoffs for the first time since 2008 and were eliminated from playoff contention by the Detroit Pistons.

Draft picks

Roster

Standings

Game log

Preseason

|- style="background-color:#bfb;"
| 1
| October 68:00 pm
| Milwaukee
| 105–95
| Butler, McDermott (23)
| Bobby Portis (14)
| Jimmy Butler (6)
| United Center21,199
| 1–0
|- style="background-color:#fbb;"
| 2
| October 89:00 pm
| @ Denver
| 94–111
| Nikola Mirotić (18)
| Bobby Portis (17)
| Jimmy Butler (4)
| Coors Event Center5,305
| 1–1
|- style="background-color:#bfb;"
| 3
| October 107:00 pm
| @ Minnesota
| 114–105
| E'Twaun Moore (18)
| Mitić, Mirotić (8)
| E'Twaun Moore (5)
| MTS Centre15,294
| 2–1
|- style="background-color:#fbb;"
| 4
| October 128:00 pm
| New Orleans
| 115–123
| Bobby Portis (20)
| Bobby Portis (11)
| Butler, Mirotić, Moore (3)
| United Center21,407
| 2–2
|- style="background-color:#fbb;"
| 5
| October 148:00 pm
| Detroit
| 91–114
| E'Twaun Moore (16)
| Joakim Noah (9)
| E'Twaun Moore (4)
| United Center21,713
| 2–3
|- style="background-color:#fbb;"
| 6
| October 197:00 pm
| @ Charlotte
| 86–94
| Jimmy Butler (18)
| Joakim Noah (13)
| Joakim Noah (7)
| Time Warner Cable Arena8,769
| 2–4
|- style="background-color:#bfb;"
| 7
| October 208:00 pm
| Indiana
| 103–94
| Aaron Brooks (22)
| Pau Gasol (8)
| Brooks, Butler (6)
| United Center21,512
| 3–4
|- style="background-color:#bfb;"
| 8
| October 238:00 pm
| Dallas
| 103–102
| Taj Gibson (16)
| Joakim Noah (10)
| Jimmy Butler (6)
| Pinnacle Bank Arena15,297
| 4–4

Regular season

|- style="background:#bfb;"
| 1
| October 27
| Cleveland
| 
| Nikola Mirotić (19)
| Taj Gibson (10)
| Derrick Rose (5)
| United Center21,957
| 1–0
|- style="background:#bfb;"
| 2
| October 28
| @ Brooklyn
| 
| Jimmy Butler (24)
| Gasol & Mirotić (9)
| Jimmy Butler (6)
| Barclays Center17,732
| 2–0
|-style="background:#fbb;"
| 3
| October 30
| @ Detroit
| 
| Jimmy Butler (23)
| Pau Gasol (12)
| Derrick Rose (6)
| Palace of Auburn Hills16,035
| 2–1

|- style="background:#bfb;"
| 4
| November 1
| Orlando
| 
| Gasol & Mirotić  (16)
| Joakim Noah (9)
| Derrick Rose (8)
| United Center21,585
| 3–1
|- style="background:#fbb;"
| 5
| November 3
| @ Charlotte
| 
| Jimmy Butler (26)
| Pau Gasol (8)
| Derrick Rose (5)
| Time Warner Cable Arena15,136
| 3–2
|- style="background:#bfb;"
| 6
| November 5
| Oklahoma City
| 
| Derrick Rose (29)
| Pau Gasol (10)
| Derrick Rose (7)
| United Center21,861
| 4–2
|- style="background:#fbb;"
| 7
| November 7
| Minnesota
| 
| Pau Gasol (21)
| Pau Gasol (14)
| Joakim Noah (7)
| United Center21,988
| 4–3
|- style="background:#bfb;"
| 8
| November 9
| @ Philadelphia
| 
| Nikola Mirotić (20)
| Nikola Mirotić (10)
| Derrick Rose (8)
| Wells Fargo Center13,879
| 5–3
|- style="background:#bfb;"
| 9
| November 13
| Charlotte
| 
| Jimmy Butler (27)
| Joakim Noah (18)
| Derrick Rose (8)
| United Center21,749
| 6–3
|- style="background:#bfb;"
| 10
| November 16
| Indiana
| 
| Derrick Rose (23)
| Pau Gasol (13)
| Derrick Rose (7)
| United Center21,660
| 7–3
|- style="background:#bfb;"
| 11
| November 18
| @ Phoenix
| 
| Jimmy Butler (32)
| Joakim Noah (11)
| Kirk Hinrich (6)
| Talking Stick Resort Arena17,377
| 8–3
|- style="background:#fbb;"
| 12
| November 20
| @ Golden State
| 
| Jimmy Butler (28)
| Mirotic, Gasol (10)
| Jimmy Butler (7)
| Oracle Arena19,596
| 8–4
|- style="background:#bfb;"
| 13
| November 24
| @ Portland
| 
| Jimmy Butler (22)
| Pau Gasol (14)
| Derrick Rose (6)
| Moda Center19,393
| 9–4
|- style="background:#fbb;"
| 14
| November 27
| @ Indiana
| 
| Nikola Mirotic (25)
| Pau Gasol (11)
| Butler, Rose (5)
| Bankers Life Fieldhouse18,165
| 9–5
|- style="background:#bfb;"
| 15
| November 30
| San Antonio
| 
| Pau Gasol (18)
| Pau Gasol (13)
| Joakim Noah (7)
| United Center21,909
| 10–5

|- style="background:#bfb;"
| 16
| December 2
| Denver
| 
| Pau Gasol (24)
| Pau Gasol (16)
| Derrick Rose (9)
| United Center21,349
| 11–5
|- style="background:#fbb;"
| 17
| December 5
| Charlotte
| 
| Jimmy Butler (25)
| Pau Gasol (11)
| Joakim Noah (6)
| United Center21,770
| 11–6
|- style="background:#fbb;"
| 18
| December 7
| Phoenix
| 
| Pau Gasol (22)
| Pau Gasol (10)
| Gasol, Noah (6)
| United Center21,337
| 11–7
|- style="background:#fbb;"
| 19
| December 9
| @ Boston
| 
| Jimmy Butler (36)
| Pau Gasol (15)
| Derrick Rose (6)
| TD Garden17,318
| 11–8
|- style="background:#bfb;"
| 20
| December 10
| L. A. Clippers
| 
| Pau Gasol (24)
| Joakim Noah (13)
| Jimmy Butler (8)
| United Center21,491
| 12–8
|- style="background:#bfb;"
| 21
| December 12
| New Orleans
| 
| Pau Gasol (18)
| Pau Gasol (11)
| Brooks, Rose (3)
| United Center21,605
| 13–8
|- style="background:#bfb;"
| 22
| December 14
| Philadelphia
| 
| Jimmy Butler (23)
| Joakim Noah (15)
| Joakim Noah (8)
| United Center21,166
| 14–8
|- style="background:#bfb;"
| 23
| December 16
| Memphis
| 
| Jimmy Butler (24)
| Pau Gasol (14)
| Noah, Rose (5)
| United Center21,032
| 15–8
|- style="background:#fbb;"
| 24
| December 18
| Detroit
| 
| Jimmy Butler (43)
| Pau Gasol (15)
| Derrick Rose (8)
| United Center21,534
| 15–9
|- style="background:#fbb;"
| 25
| December 19
| @ New York
| 
| Joakim Noah (21)
| Bobby Portis (11)
| Jimmy Butler (5)
| Madison Square Garden19,812
| 15–10
|- style="background:#fbb;"
| 26
| December 21
| Brooklyn
| 
| Jimmy Butler (24)
| Gasol, Gibson (9)
| Joakim Noah (8)
| United Center21,825
| 15–11
|-style="background:#bfb;"
| 27
| December 25
| @ Oklahoma City
| 
| Jimmy Butler (23)
| Pau Gasol (13)
| Pau Gasol (6)
| Chesapeake Energy Arena18,203
| 16–11
|-style="background:#fbb;"
| 28
| December 26
| @ Dallas
| 
| Nikola Mirotic (23)
| Pau Gasol (9)
| Jimmy Butler (8)
| American Airlines Center20,392
| 16–12
|-style="background:#bfb;"
| 29
| December 28
| Toronto
| 
| Gasol, Snell (22)
| Taj Gibson (11)
| Butler, Brooks (5)
| United Center21,898
| 17–12
|-style="background:#bfb;"
| 30
| December 30
| Indiana
| 
| Aaron Brooks (22)
| Taj Gibson (14)
| Aaron Brooks (5)
| United Center22,206
| 18–12

|- style="background:#bfb;"
| 31
| January 1
| New York
| 
| Jimmy Butler (23)
| Bobby Portis (10)
| Nikola Mirotic (7)
| United Center22,443
| 19–12
|- style="background:#bfb;"
| 32
| January 3
| @ Toronto
| 
| Jimmy Butler (42)
| Pau Gasol (13)
| Pau Gasol (6)
| Air Canada Centre19,800
| 20–12
|-style="background:#bfb;"
| 33
| January 5
| Milwaukee
| 
| Jimmy Butler (32)
| Taj Gibson (14)
| Jimmy Butler (10)
| United Center21,686
| 21–12
|- style="background:#bfb;"
| 34
| January 7
| Boston
| 
| Jimmy Butler (19)
| Pau Gasol (18)
| Jimmy Butler (10)
| United Center21,497
| 22–12
|-style="background:#fbb;"
| 35
| January 9
| @ Atlanta
| 
| Jimmy Butler (27)
| Nikola Mirotic (10)
| Gasol, Rose (5)
| Philips Arena19,010
| 22–13
|- style="background:#fbb;"
| 36
| January 11
| Washington
| 
| Derrick Rose (23)
| Pau Gasol (10)
| Jimmy Butler (7)
| United Center21,409
| 22–14
|- style="background:#fbb;"
| 37
| January 12
| @ Milwaukee
| 
| Jimmy Butler (30)
| Pau Gasol (14)
| Jimmy Butler (6)
| BMO Harris Bradley Center16,867
| 22–15
|- style="background:#bfb;"
| 38
| January 14
| @ Philadelphia
| 
| Jimmy Butler (53)
| Joakim Noah (16)
| Joakim Noah (8)
| Wells Fargo Center14,063
| 23–15
|- style="background:#fbb;"
| 39
| January 15
| Dallas
| 
| Derrick Rose (18)
| Taj Gibson (11)
| Jimmy Butler (6)
| United Center22,056
| 23–16
|- style="background:#bfb;"
| 40
| January 18
| @ Detroit
| 
| Pau Gasol (31)
| Pau Gasol (12)
| Aaron Brooks (10)
| Palace of Auburn Hills18,935
| 24–16
|-style="background:#fbb;"
| 41
| January 20
| Golden State
| 
| Derrick Rose (29)
| Gasol, Portis (8)
| Brooks, Butler, McDermott, Mirotic, Moore, Rose, Snell (2)
| United Center23,152
| 24–17
|- style="background:#fbb;"
| 42
| January 22
| @ Boston
| 
| Jimmy Butler (28)
| Jimmy Butler (14)
| Butler, Gasol, Rose (3)
| TD Garden18,624
| 24–18
|- style="background:#bfb;"
| 43
| January 23
| @ Cleveland
| 
| Pau Gasol (25)
| Pau Gasol (10)
| Pau Gasol (6)
| Quicken Loans Arena20,562
| 25–18
|- style="background:#fbb;"
| 44
| January 25
| Miami
| 
| Pau Gasol (19)
| Pau Gasol (17)
| Aaron Brooks (6)
| United Center21,720
| 25–19
|- style="background:#bfb;"
| 45
| January 28
| @ L. A. Lakers
| 
| Jimmy Butler (26)
| Pau Gasol (12)
| Jimmy Butler (10)
| Staples Center18,997
| 26–19
|- style="background:#fbb;"
| 46
| January 31
| @ L. A. Clippers
| 
| Jimmy Butler (23)
| Pau Gasol (14)
| Gasol, Moore (5)
| Staples Center19,325
| 26–20

|- style="background:#fbb;"
| 47
| February 1
| @ Utah
| 
| Jimmy Butler (26)
| Taj Gibson (11)
| Jimmy Butler (6)
| Vivint Smart Home Arena18,811
| 26–21
|-style="background:#bfb;"
| 48
| February 3
| @ Sacramento
| 
| E'Twaun Moore (24)
| Pau Gasol (13)
| Derrick Rose (9)
| Sleep Train Arena17,317
| 27–21
|-style="background:#fbb;"
| 49
| February 5
| @ Denver
| 
| Derrick Rose (30)
| Derrick Rose (9)
| Derrick Rose (8)
| Pepsi Center19,155
| 27–22
|-style="background:#fbb;"
| 50
| February 6
| @ Minnesota
| 
| Pau Gasol (25)
| Pau Gasol (8)
| Derrick Rose (10)
| Target Center17,876
| 27–23
|-style="background:#fbb;"
| 51
| February 8
| @ Charlotte
| 
| Pau Gasol (22)
| Pau Gasol (10)
| Pau Gasol (7)
| Time Warner Cable Arena15,886
| 27–24
|-style="background:#fbb;"
| 52
| February 10
| Atlanta
| 
| Pau Gasol (20)
| Gasol, Portis (10)
| Gasol, Moore (5)
| United Center21,709
| 27–25
|- align="center"
| colspan="9" style="background:#bbcaff;" | All-Star Break
|- style="background:#fbb;"
| 53
| February 18
| @ Cleveland
| 
| Derrick Rose (28)
| Bobby Portis (10)
| Pau Gasol (4)
| Quicken Loans Arena20,562
| 27–26
|- style="background:#bfb;"
| 54
| February 19
| Toronto
| 
| Doug McDermott (30)
| Pau Gasol (11)
| Pau Gasol (9)
| United Center21,849
| 28–26
|- style="background:#bfb;"
| 55
| February 21
| L. A. Lakers
| 
| Moore, Rose (24)
| Taj Gibson (8)
| Derrick Rose (6)
| United Center23,143
| 29–26
|- style="background:#bfb;"
| 56
| February 24
| Washington
| 
| Moore, Gibson (17)
| Pau Gasol (15)
| Pau Gasol (9)
| United Center21,560
| 30–26
|- style="background:#fbb;"
| 57
| February 26
| @ Atlanta
| 
| Doug McDermott (20)
| Pau Gasol (17)
| Aaron Brooks (5)
| Philips Arena18,123
| 30–27
|- style="background:#fbb;"
| 58
| February 27
| Portland
| 
| Pau Gasol (22)
| Pau Gasol (16)
| Pau Gasol (14)
| United Center21,962
| 30–28

|- style="background:#fbb;"
| 59
| March 1
| @ Miami
| 
| Derrick Rose (17)
| Pau Gasol (9)
| Pau Gasol (6)
| American Airlines Arena19,654
| 30–29
|- style="background:#fbb;"
| 60
| March 2
| @ Orlando
| 
| Derrick Rose (16)
| Dunleavy Jr., Portis (6)
| Derrick Rose (6)
| Amway Center16,072
| 30–30
|-style="background:#bfb;"
| 61
| March 5
| Houston
| 
| Pau Gasol (28)
| Pau Gasol (17)
| Derrick Rose (9)
| United Center22,203
| 31–30
|-style="background:#bfb;"
| 62
| March 7
| Milwaukee
| 
| Derrick Rose (22)
| Pau Gasol (17)
| Pau Gasol (13)
| United Center21,672
| 32–30
|-style="background:#fbb;"
| 63
| March 10
| @ San Antonio
| 
| Gasol, Rose (21)
| Pau Gasol (12)
| Derrick Rose (6)
| AT&T Center18,418
| 32–31
|-style="background:#fbb;"
| 64
| March 11
| Miami
| 
| Pau Gasol (17)
| Pau Gasol (12)
| Derrick Rose (9)
| United Center22,067
| 32–32
|-style="background:#bfb;"
| 65
| March 14
| @ Toronto
| 
| Doug McDermott (29)
| Taj Gibson (10)
| Jimmy Butler (6)
| Air Canada Centre19,800
| 33–32
|-style="background:#fbb;"
| 66
| March 16
| @ Washington
| 
| Doug McDermott (20)
| Butler, Felicio, Holiday (6)
| Derrick Rose (4)
| Verizon Center19,556
| 33–33
|-style="background:#bfb;"
| 67
| March 17
| Brooklyn
| 
| Jimmy Butler (22)
| Bobby Portis (14)
| Jimmy Butler (7)
| United Center21,513
| 34–33
|-style="background:#bfb;"
| 68
| March 19
| Utah
| 
| Derrick Rose (22)
| Taj Gibson (10)
| Jimmy Butler (6)
| United Center21,856
| 35–33
|-style="background:#bfb;"
| 69
| March 21
| Sacramento
| 
| Gibson, Rose (18)
| Pau Gasol (14)
| Jimmy Butler (8)
| United Center21,531
| 36–33
|-style="background:#fbb;"
| 70
| March 23
| New York
| 
| Nikola Mirotic (35)
| Nikola Mirotic (6)
| Jimmy Butler (8)
| United Center21,788
| 36–34
|-style="background:#fbb;"
| 71
| March 24
| @ New York
| 
| Derrick Rose (30)
| Gibson, Mirotic (6)
| Butler, Mirotic, Rose (3)
| Madison Square Garden19,812
| 36–35
|-style="background:#fbb;"
| 72
| March 26
| @ Orlando
| 
| Taj Gibson (16)
| Bobby Portis (7)
| Pau Gasol (8)
| Amway Center18,846
| 36–36
|-style="background:#fbb;"
| 73
| March 28
| Atlanta
| 
| Derrick Rose (20)
| Taj Gibson (12)
| Gasol, Rose (5)
| United Center21,761
| 36–37
|-style="background:#bfb;"
| 74
| March 29
| @ Indiana
| 
| Nikola Mirotic (28)
| Pau Gasol (12)
| Pau Gasol (7)
| Bankers Life Fieldhouse17,050
| 37–37
|- style="background:#bfb;"
| 75
| March 31
| @ Houston
| 
| Nikola Mirotic (28)
| Pau Gasol (10)
| Jimmy Butler (6)
| Toyota Center18,244
| 38–37

|-style="background:#fbb;"
| 76
| April 2
| Detroit
| 
| Jimmy Butler (28)
| Jimmy Butler (17)
| Jimmy Butler (12)
| United Center22,197
| 38–38
|-style="background:#bfb;"
| 77
| April 3
| @ Milwaukee
| 
| Jimmy Butler (25)
| Pau Gasol (8)
| Pau Gasol (8)
| BMO Harris Bradley Center15,768
| 39–38
|-style="background:#fbb;"
| 78
| April 5
| @ Memphis
| 
| Nikola Mirotic (20)
| Pau Gasol (10)
| Derrick Rose (8)
| FedEx Forum17,591
| 39–39
|-style="background:#fbb;"
| 79
| April 7
| @ Miami
| 
| Jimmy Butler (25)
| Pau Gasol (12)
| Jimmy Butler (6)
| American Airlines Arena19,771
| 39–40
|-style="background:#bfb;"
| 80
| April 9
| Cleveland
| 
| Jimmy Butler (21)
| Pau Gasol (12)
| Jimmy Butler (6)
| United Center22,186
| 40–40
|-style="background:#bfb;"
| 81
| April 11
| @ New Orleans
| 
| Jimmy Butler (23)
| Bobby Portis (8)
| Jimmy Butler (11)
| Smoothie King Center16,867
| 41–40
|-style="background:#bfb;"
| 82
| April 13
| Philadelphia
| 
| Nikola Mirotic (32)
| Bobby Portis (14)
| Jimmy Butler (10)
| United Center21,777
| 42–40

References

Chicago Bulls seasons
Chicago Bulls
Chicago
Chicago